Jeffrey L. Melman (born May 18, 1947) is an American television director and producer. Melman has directed for several present-day network television series. More recently Melman has directed episodes of ABC's Grey's Anatomy, Private Practice and Desperate Housewives. Melman previously directed on many hit sitcoms which include The Fresh Prince of Bel-Air, Malcolm in the Middle, Everybody Loves Raymond, That's My Bush!, The King of Queens, Two and a Half Men and Frasier. Melman was also a producer on Oliver Beene, Laverne & Shirley, and Night Court.

Filmography
Private Practice (2007) TV series
episode 1.07 "In Which Sam Gets Taken For a Ride"
episode 2.09 "Know When to Fold"
Everybody Hates Chris
episode 1.21 "Everybody Hates Jail"
Ugly Betty (2006) TV series
episode 1.17 "Icing on the Cake"
Grey's Anatomy (2005) TV series
episode 2.06 "Into You Like a Train"
episode 2.23 "Blues for Sister Someone"
episode 3.02 "I Am a Tree"
episode 3.05 "Oh, the Guilt"
episode 3.08 "Staring at the Sun"
episode 4.07 "Physical Attraction Chemical Reaction"
Hot Properties (2005) TV series
episode "Online Dating"
episode "It's a Wonderful Christmas Carol on 34th Street"
episode "When Chloe Met Marco"
episode "Whatever Lola Wants"
episode "Return of the Ring"
episode "Dating Up, Dating Down"
episode "Waiting For Oprah"
Living With Fran (2005) TV series
Desperate Housewives (2004) TV series
episode 1.04 "Who's That Woman?"
episode 1.14 "Love Is in the Air"
episode 1.17 "There Won't Be Trumpets"
episode 1.20 "Fear No More"
Two and a Half Men (2003) TV series
episode 5.17 "Fish in a Drawer"
episode 5.19 "Waiting for the Right Snapper"
episode 6.08 "Pinocchio's Mouth"
episode 6.09 "The Mooch at the Boo"
episode 6.10 "He Smelled the Ham, He Got Excited"
episode 6.11 "The Devil's Lube"
episode 6.12 "Thank God for Scoliosis"
episode 6.13 "I Think You Offended Don"
episode 6.14 "David Copperfield Slipped Me a Roofie"
episode 6.15 "I'd Like to Start with the Cat"
episode 6.16 "She'll Still Be Dead at Halftime"
Arrested Development (2003) TV series
episode 2.04 "Good Grief!"
Sixteen to Life (2003) TV series
Luis (2003) TV series
episode 1.01 "Pilot"
Oliver Beene (2003) TV series
Exit 9 (2003) TV series
Off Centre (2001) TV series
Scrubs (2001) TV series
episode 1.11 "My Own Personal Jesus"
That's My Bush! (2001) TV series
Titus (2000) TV series
episode "Tommy's Girlfriend II"
Malcolm in the Middle (2000) TV series
episode 1.05 "Malcolm Babysits"
episode 1.15 "Smunday"
episode 2.04 "Dinner Out"
episode 2.06 "Convention"
episode 2.09 "High School Play"
episode 2.10 "The Bully"
episode 2.16 "Traffic Ticket"
episode 2.17 "Surgery"
episode 2.18 "Reese Cooks"
episode 2.25 "Flashback"
episode 3.05 "Charity"
episode 3.07 "Christmas"
episode 3.10 "Lois's Makeover"
episode 3.13 "Reese Drives"
episode 3.16 "Hal Coaches"
episode 3.18 "Poker #2"
episode 3.21 "Cliques"
episode 4.02 "Humilithon"
episode 4.07 "Malcolm Holds His Tongue"
episode 4.12 "Kicked Out"
episode 4.14 "Hal's Friend"
Stark Raving Mad (1999) TV series
The Parkers (1999) TV series
Becker (1998) TV series
Encore! Encore! (1998) TV series
The King of Queens (1998) TV series
episode 3.04 "Class Struggle"
Holding the Baby (1998)TV series
LateLine (1998) TV series
Jenny (1997) TV series
Veronica's Closet (1997) TV series
episode "Veronica's Thanksgiving That Keeps on Giving"
Fired Up (1997) TV series
Just Shoot Me! (1997) TV series
Sabrina the Teenage Witch (1996) TV series
episode 4.03 "Jealousy"
episode 4.10 "Ice Station Sabrina"
episode 4.15 "Love in Bloom"
episode 4.17 "Salem's Daughter"
episode 5.02 "Double Time"
episode 6.15 "Time After Time"
episode 6.16 "Sabrina and the Kiss"
episode 7.04 "Shift Happens" 
Men Behaving Badly (1996) TV series
Everybody Loves Raymond (1996) TV series
episode 2.20 "T-Ball"
episode 2.22 "Six Feet Under"
episode 2.23 "The Garage Sale"
episode 2.24 & 2.25: "The Wedding, Parts One & Two"
The Pursuit of Happiness (1995) TV series
Almost Perfect (1995) TV series
Saved by the Bell: Wedding in Las Vegas (1994) TV film
The George Carlin Show (1994) TV series
Frasier (1993) TV series
episode 3.06 "Sleeping with the Enemy"
episode 4.02 "Love Bites Dog"
episode 4.04 "A Cranes' Critique"
episode 4.06 "Mixed Doubles"
episode 4.07 "A Lilith Thanksgiving "
episode 4.08 "Our Father Whose Art Ain't Heaven"
episode 4.13 "Four for the Seesaw"
episode 4.15 "Roz's Krantz & Gouldenstein are Dead"
episode 4.19 "Three Dates and a Breakup, Part 1"
episode 4.20 "Three Dates and a Breakup, Part 2"
episode 4.23 "Ask Me No Questions"
episode 4.24 "Odd Man Out"
episode 5.04 "Kid, The"
episode 5.07 "My Fair Frasier"
episode 5.10 "Where Every Bloke Knows Your Name"
episode 5.13 "The Maris Counselor"
episode 5.16 "Beware of Greeks"
episode 5.17 "Perfect Guy, The"
episode 5.22 "The Life of the Party"
episode 5.23 "Party, Party"
Saved by the Bell: The College Years (1993) TV series
Flying Blind (1992) TV series
Melrose Place (1992) TV series
Red Dwarf (1992) (TV)
Charlie Hoover (1991) TV series
Beverly Hills, 90210 (1990) TV series
episode "Dead End"
episode "Dealer's Choice"
episode "The Girl from New York City"
episode "Misery Loves Company"
episode "Sex, Lies and Volleyball/Photo Fini"
episode "A Song for Myself"
The Fresh Prince of Bel-Air (1990) TV series
Parker Lewis Can't Lose (1990) TV series
episode 1.11 "Radio Free Flamingo"
episode 2.05 "Undergraduate, The"
Wings (1990) TV series
A Family for Joe (1990) TV series
Sister Kate (1989) TV series
Hooperman (1987) TV series
My Two Dads (1987) TV series
Night Court (1984) TV series
Making the Grade (1982) TV series

References

External links

American television directors
Television producers from Pennsylvania
Living people
Artists from Harrisburg, Pennsylvania
1947 births